Centre d'Esports Arenys de Munt is a Catalan sports club from Arenys de Munt, Maresme founded in 1929, hosting football, futsal, rink hockey and rugby teams.

History

CE Arenys de Munt is best known for its rink hockey section, established in 1960. The men's team played in the top category through the 1970s, and in 1977 it reached the Cup Winners' Cup's final, lost to AD Oeiras. The women's team surpassed it from the 1990s, winning two national championships in 1999 and 2004 and reaching the European League's final, lost to Gijón HC. The club was finally relegated from the OK Liga in 2012 and dissolved in 2016.

In 2017, the men's team promoted to the OK Liga 19 years after their last relegation. At the final of this season the club was relegated to Primera División.

Season to season

Women's team

Men's team

Titles

Women's Rink Hockey
 Spanish Championship (2)
 1999, 2004

References

External links
Official website

Catalan rink hockey clubs
Sports clubs established in 1929